Tarłów  is a village (a town in 1550–1870) in Opatów County, Świętokrzyskie Voivodeship, in south-central Poland. It is the seat of the gmina (administrative district) called Gmina Tarłów. The village has a population of 790, and belongs to historic province of Lesser Poland.

The history of Tarłów dates back to 1550, when a local nobleman, Andrzej Tarło, founded the town named after himself, which replaced the already existing village of Czekarzewice. Tarłów received its charter in 1550 from King Zygmunt August, in Piotrków Trybunalski. The town's inhabitants, thanks to the King's order, were exempt from paying taxes for 20 years. In 1614 Tarłów got its first, wooden church, founded by Mikołaj Oleśnicki. In 1636 a hospital was opened, and in 1647, the wooden church was replaced with a brick church of Holy Trinity, which still stands.

During the Deluge, Swedish invaders destroyed and ransacked most of Lesser Poland's towns, including Tarłów. After the wars, the town never recovered. In 1851, when Tarłów already belonged to the Russian-controlled Congress Poland, it almost completely burned - all that remained were four houses and the church. During the January Uprising Tarłów was one of the centers of the rebellion, for which in 1869 the Russians stripped it of the town rights. In 1873, a pandemic of cholera decimated the population, including local artisans, famous for their pots. In 1877 Tarłów got a courthouse of the gmina, and in 1905 - first fire station. In 1927, the government of the Second Polish Republic opened here an elementary school, in a complex which is still used. In 1915, during World War I, 1st Brigade, Polish Legions fought here with Russian troops. During World War II, Tarłów's Jewish population was murdered in the Holocaust. In 1943, the Home Army company Tarłów was created, which in the summer 1944 took part in the Operation Tempest.

Famous Rabbis
Jacob Joshua Falk (1680 - 1756) the famous Talmudist and author of the Pene Yehoshua was Rabbi in Tarłów for a time.

Rabbi Yehudah Yudel Rosenberg (1859-1935) was rabbi in Tarłów from 1885 to 1889 or 1890 (he had married a woman from Tarłów in 1877) and became known in Poland as Rav Yudel Tarlow'er.

A prolific author, Rabbi  Rosenberg assumed a number of positions in Poland, before moving to Toronto, Canada, where he became rabbi of Beth Jacob, a Polish Jewish congregation that was established in 1897.  There he founded the Eitz Chaim school (which still exists today),  before moving to Montreal in 1919, where he served as one of its most prominent rabbis, until 1935, when he died at the age of seventy-five. Scholars believe that many of the stories told today about the Golem of Prague (attributed to the Maharal of Prague - Judah Loew ben Bezalel) were in fact first authored by Rabbi Yudel Rosenberg.

Canadian author Mordecai Richler from Montreal (and a grandson of Rabbi Rosenberg) and Canadian religious leader Eli Rubenstein from Toronto (whose grandfather was born in Tarlow), have roots in the town.

Fate of Tarłów's Jewish Population

After World War I, about 1,000 Jews lived in Tarłów, roughly half of the small town's population. They worked in crafts and small-time trade - some farmed small plots of land near their homes. Most of its Jewish population was traditional (Orthodox) with a smaller percentage identifying with Zionism.

In September 1939, the Germans occupied Tarłów.  They established a Judenrat, and forced them to collect large sums of money in ransoms, and also gathered Jewish residents for forced labor.

The  ghetto in  Tarłów was set up in December 1941. In June 1942, seventy young Jews were sent from the ghetto to the Skarżysko-Kamienna labor camp. A few months later, the Germans brought Jews from nearby towns to the Tarłów ghetto, and the ghetto population swelled to approximately 7,000 people.

On October 29, 1942, the majority of ghetto inhabitants were deported to Treblinka. During the deportation, more than 100 Jews were murdered in Tarłów, the rest were sent to Treblinka where they were all murdered immediately.  Afterwards, dozens who were found hiding were executed in a  mass grave at the Jewish cemetery in Tarłów.

Today there is not a single Jew left in Tarłów or even within miles of the town. Not far from the centre, the town's former synagogue (built in 1786)  lies in ruins, overrun with bushes and trees.

Cemetery Restoration
In the fall of 2011, the Jewish cemetery in Tarłów, which had laid in ruins since the Holocaust, was rededicated in a ceremony attended by Jewish people from around the world with roots in Tarłów, along with the town's residents. The initiative to restore the cemetery had begun a decade earlier, with the efforts of a local Polish citizen, Dr. Jan Curylo, who had organized the cemetery reclamation effort.

The inscription at the newly restored cemetery reads:

"In memory of the righteous Jews of Tarlow,  those brutally murdered during the war, whose graves will forever be unknown, and those whose graves were desecrated here - at the hands of the soulless Nazi murderers.
 
May the descendants of Tarlow's Jews honor their memory through the observance of Torah and Mitzvot and by creating peace in the world.
 
This cemetery has been restored by North American Jews with roots in Tarlow and the surrounding region."

Points of interest 
 Baroque cross-shaped Holy Trinity church (17th century), with bell towers from 1653
 parish cemetery (late 18th century)
 ruins of a synagogue (1786)

References

Villages in Opatów County
Sandomierz Voivodeship
Radom Governorate
Kielce Voivodeship (1919–1939)
Holocaust locations in Poland